Ancita ochraceovittata is a species of beetle in the family Cerambycidae. It was described by Stephan von Breuning in 1936. It is indigenous to Papua New Guinea.

References

Ancita
Beetles described in 1936